West Jordan High School is a public high school located southwest of Salt Lake City in West Jordan, Utah. It enrolls around 1,800 students.

History 
The school opened in 1981 with an expected enrollment of 1,298.

Extracurriculars 
The men's varsity basketball team won the 2001 state championship, as well as the 2009 State championship against Lone Peak High School, the two-time defending champion.

West Jordan is well known for its music program. It has one of the largest choir programs of any public school in the state, with a record enrollment of over 300 students. The band and orchestra programs also consistently score well in competitions.

Notable alumni
Travis Hall, NFL player
John Penisini, NFL player

D. J. Tialavea, NFL player

References

External links
West Jordan High School
Jordan School District info page

Public high schools in Utah
Schools in Salt Lake County, Utah
Buildings and structures in West Jordan, Utah
Educational institutions established in 1981
1981 establishments in Utah